The Lola T900 is an open-wheel racing car chassis, designed and built by Lola Cars that competed in the CART open-wheel racing series, for competition in the 1985 IndyCar season. It won a total of 5 races that season, with Al Unser Jr. taking 2 wins, and Mario Andretti taking 3 wins, while narrowly missing out on another win at that year's Indianapolis 500. It was powered by the  Ford-Cosworth DFX.

References 

Open wheel racing cars
American Championship racing cars
Lola racing cars